Étienne-Prosper Berne-Bellecour (29 June 1838 – 29 November 1910) was a French painter, printmaker, and illustrator. He was known for his war art.

Biography
Berne-Bellecour was born on 29 June 1838 in Boulogne, France. He studied under François-Édouard Picot and Félix-Joseph Barrias. He initially painted landscapes and portraits. He worked in photography to support himself while he studied. He also attended the École des Beaux-Arts and competed for the Prix de Rome in 1859.

Berne-Bellecour, along with his brother-in-law Jehan Georges Vibert, produced a comedic play titled "La Tribune Mécanique" which was performed at the Palais Royal in 1862. He showcased his works at several Salons in the 1860s and later.

He won a prize for photography at the Universal Exposition of 1867. In 1868, Vibert encouraged Berne-Bellecour to devote himself entirely to painting.

Berne-Bellecour, Vibert, Alexander Louis Leloir, and Édouard Detaille went on a trip to Africa in 1870, later returning to serve in the Franco-Prussian War.

Berne-Bellecour served in the francs-tireurs and won a medal for gallantry under fire. His later works focused on military subjects.

He also practiced as a sculptor and an etcher. He was named a Chevalier in the French Legion of Honor in 1878.

Berne-Bellecour died in Paris on 29 November 1910. His son Jean-Jacques Berne-Bellecour (1874–1939) was also a military painter.

Gallery

References

External links

Étienne-Prosper Berne-Bellecour at the Art Renewal Center
Etienne-Prosper Berne-Bellecour at J.M. Stringer Gallery

1838 births
1910 deaths
People from Boulogne-sur-Mer
École des Beaux-Arts alumni
Chevaliers of the Légion d'honneur
19th-century French painters
French male painters
19th-century French photographers
19th-century French sculptors
19th-century French male artists
French male sculptors
19th-century war artists
20th-century French painters
20th-century French sculptors
20th-century French male artists
French war artists
French printmakers
French illustrators
French landscape painters
French portrait painters
French etchers
French military personnel of the Franco-Prussian War